Târnova is a commune in Caraș-Severin County, western Romania with a population of 1,731 people (2011). It is composed of two villages, Bratova and Târnova.

References

Communes in Caraș-Severin County
Localities in Romanian Banat